"Christine Sixteen" is a song by American hard rock band Kiss. It originally appeared on their 1977 album Love Gun. Released as a single in the US in 1977, the song peaked at number 25 on the Billboard Hot 100 chart that year, and did well in Canada, peaking at number 22.

Written and sung by bassist/vocalist Gene Simmons, the song is about an older man who is infatuated with a 16-year-old girl named Christine. The song's subject and lyrics were controversial and made some hit radio stations reluctant to put it on their playlists, while others (including WABC in the band's home town of New York, and WKBW in Buffalo) only played it after 7 PM as an album cut. The song's title was originated by bandmate Paul Stanley who was planning to write a song under the title, until Simmons beat him to it. Two different time lengths are printed on the single; one at 3:13, and another at 2:52. Both versions run 3:10.

According to interviews in Guitar World, both Eddie and Alex Van Halen played on the original demos. When Kiss recorded their version of the song, Simmons said that he made Frehley copy Eddie's solo from the demo.

Cash Box said that "it's a tale of teenage lust, put to a bump and grind rock accompaniment that utilizes channel-hopping vocals."

The song was sampled by Tone Lōc in his 1989 song "Funky Cold Medina". The song was covered by the Gin Blossoms on the 1994 Kiss tribute album Kiss My Ass: Classic Kiss Regrooved and by All on Hard to Believe: Kiss Covers Compilation. The song was also covered by punk/goth band The Nuns on their 2003 album New York Vampires.

Credited personnel
On Love Gun
Gene Simmons – lead vocals, bass guitar, (uncredited) rhythm guitar
Ace Frehley – lead guitar, backing vocals
Paul Stanley – rhythm guitar, backing vocals
Peter Criss – drums, percussion, backing vocals
Eddie Kramer – piano

On Jigoku-Retsuden
Gene Simmons – lead vocals, bass guitar
Tommy Thayer – lead guitar, backing vocals
Paul Stanley – rhythm guitar
Eric Singer – drums, backing vocals

Brian Whelan – (uncredited) piano

Chart performance

Weekly charts

Year-end charts

References

Kiss (band) songs
1977 singles
Casablanca Records singles
Songs written by Gene Simmons
1977 songs
Obscenity controversies in music
Sexuality and age in fiction